Trick Pony is the debut studio album from the American country music group of the same name, released in 2001 via Warner Bros. Records Nashville. The album produced three singles in "Pour Me", "On a Night Like This", and "Just What I Do", which respectively reached #12, #4, and #13 on the Billboard Hot Country Singles & Tracks (now Hot Country Songs) charts. "Just What I Do" was nominated for the 2003 Grammy Awards for "Best Country Performance By A Duo Or Group With Vocals". Also included is a cover of Johnny Cash's "Big River", here covered with Cash and Waylon Jennings.

Track listing

Personnel

Trick Pony
Keith Burns – acoustic guitar, lead guitarist, lead vocals on “Just What I Do”
Ira Dean – upright bass, bass guitar, percussion, vocals
Heidi Newfield – vocals, harmonica, acoustic guitar

Additional musicians
Kenny Aronoff – drums
Daniel Blank – fiddle
Pat Buchanan – electric guitar
Johnny Cash – vocals on "Big River"
Shannon Forrest – drums
Larry Franklin – fiddle
Aubrey Haynie – fiddle
John Hobbs – keyboards
Waylon Jennings – vocals on "Big River"
John Jorgenson – electric guitar
Steve Nathan – keyboards
Brian Nelson – percussion
Jimmy Nichols – keyboards
Russ Pahl – electric guitar, steel guitar
Tom Roady – percussion
Brad Ruthven – electric guitar
Michael Spriggs – acoustic guitar
Travis Moon – Voice of Disc Jockey on "You Can't Say That on the Radio"

Charts

Weekly charts

Year-end charts

References

2001 debut albums
Trick Pony albums
Warner Records albums